Stephen Nedoroscik (born October 28, 1998) is an American artistic gymnast who specializes on the pommel horse.  He is the 2021 World Champion and a two-time NCAA National Champion on the event. He is a member of the United States men's national gymnastics team.

Personal life 
Nedoroscik was born in Worcester, Massachusetts on October 28, 1998 to Cheryl and John Nedoroscik.  He began gymnastics in 2003.

Gymnastics career 
As a young gymnast Nedoroscik competed on all apparatuses.  Around the time he was in high school he noticed that he was only progressing on pommel horse and decided to specialize in that event.  In 2015 and 2016 he won the Junior Olympic National title on pommel horse.  He is well known for competing in goggles which were originally a Secret Santa gift for him from Penn State teammate Ben Cooperman.

2017–18 
Nedoroscik began competing for the Penn State Nittany Lions in 2017 and became the NCAA National Champion on the pommel horse during his freshman season.  Additionally he qualified to compete at the 2017 U.S. National Championships where he finished seventh on pommel horse.

Nedoroscik began the 2018 season competing at the Winter Cup Challenge where he placed fourth on pommel horse.  At the 2018 NCAA National Championships Nedoroscik defended his pommel horse title and helped Penn State finish sixth as a team.  Although already pre-qualified to the upcoming U.S. National Championships, Nedoroscik competed at the National Qualifier where he finished fourth on pommel horse.  At the National Championships Nedoroscik placed ninth on pommel horse after having a subpar performance on day two of the competition.

2019 
Nedoroscik competed at the Winter Cup Challenge and placed first on pommel horse, winning his first elite-level title.  As a result he was added to the national team for the first time.  Nedoroscik made his international debut at the Doha World Cup where he finished sixth.  At the NCAA National Championships Nedoroscik helped Penn State finish sixth as a team and individually he finished second on pommel horse behind Alec Yoder of Ohio State.

Nedoroscik and Alex Diab were selected to compete at the World University Games.  Nedoroscik finished 13th during qualification and did not advance to the pommel horse final.  At the 2019 U.S. National Championships he finished second on pommel horse behind Sam Mikulak.  Nedoroscik ended the season competing at the Cottbus World Cup where he finished eighth.

2020–21 
In early 2020 Nedoroscik competed at the Melbourne World Cup where he won gold on pommel horse, his first international medal.  He next traveled to Azerbaijan to compete at the Baku World Cup; however he immediately returned home due the U.S. State Department raising its alert level for travel to Azerbaijan on March 6 due to COVID-19 fears.  Nedoroscik's senior NCAA season was cut short due to the ongoing COVID-19 pandemic and the NCAA Championships were canceled.  Nedoroscik was awarded the Nissen Emery Award, the highest honor in college men's gymnastics.

Nedoroscik returned to competition at the 2021 Winter Cup where he placed second on pommel horse behind Alec Yoder.  At the 2021 U.S. National Championships Nedoroscik placed first on pommel horse and won his first elite-level national title.  As a result he qualified to compete at the upcoming Olympic Trials.  At the Olympic Trials Nedoroscik fell on the first day of competition.  As a result he finished third on pommel horse and the selection committee opted to choose Yoder, who finished first, as the individual athlete to send to the Olympic Games.

In September Nedoroscik competed at the Worlds team selection trials.  He was named as one of the six members after posting scores of 14.8 and 15.5 during the two days of competition.  At the 2021 World Championships Nedoroscik qualified to the pommel horse final in second place, behind Weng Hao of China.  During the final he bested both Weng and 2020 Olympic bronze medalist Kazuma Kaya to win the world title.  This was the United States' first world title on pommel horse and the first gold medal won by an American male artistic gymnast since 2011.  Additionally it was the only gold medal won by a USA gymnast, man or woman, at the 2021 World Championships.

2022 
In late July Nedoroscik returned to competition and competed at the U.S. Classic.  Although he fell off the pommel horse he finished with the top score.  He next competed at the U.S. National Championships where he won his second consecutive national title on the pommel horse.  In October Nedoroscik was named to the team to compete at the 2022 World Championships alongside Brody Malone, Asher Hong, Colt Walker, and Donnell Whittenburg.  During qualifications Nedoroscik finished second on pommel horse and qualified to the event final.  During the team final he contributed scores on pommel horse towards the USA's fifth place finish.  During the pommel horse final he finished fifth.

Competitive history

References

External links
 
 

1998 births
Living people
Sportspeople from Worcester, Massachusetts
American male artistic gymnasts
Penn State Nittany Lions men's gymnasts
Competitors at the 2019 Summer Universiade
World champion gymnasts
Medalists at the World Artistic Gymnastics Championships
20th-century American people
21st-century American people